National Council elections were held in the Czech part of Czechoslovakia on 22 and 23 October 1976.

Results

Seats by gender
143 Male
57 Female

Notes

References

External links
Mandate and Immunity Committee Message (Czech)
Election Results (Czech)

Czech
Legislative elections in Czechoslovakia
Elections to the Chamber of Deputies of the Czech Republic
Single-candidate elections
Czech